Rachel Morgan / The Hollows series is a series of urban fantasy novels in an alternate history setting by Kim Harrison that take place primarily in the city of Cincinnati and a nearby enclave on the opposite side of the Ohio River nicknamed "The Hollows".

Following is a list of major and minor characters in the series.

Major characters

Rachel Mariana Morgan
A witch initially working as a runner for the Inderland Security (I.S.) service. She procures three wishes from a leprechaun she apprehends on her last run for the Inderlander Security service and uses a wish to get her independence. She makes a deal with the living vampire Ivy Tamwood and the pixy Jenks to give them the remaining wishes for their assistance in leaving the I.S. After creating the Vampiric Charms freelance runner service, Ivy and Jenks become her partners in taking various runs, or 'missions', both together and separately. In earlier books, she works to remove a death bounty placed on her by her former employer as well as freeing herself from a demon's curse. In the most recent books, Rachel finds herself learning about and using ley line and demon magic, both in order to do her job and protect her life and the lives of her friends and family. She is deeply ambivalent about using dark magic, but she will continue to do so when she finds it necessary.

Ivy Alisha Tamwood
A living vampire who works with Rachel at the I.S. and follows her into freelance work. Ivy is six feet tall, elegantly thin, and very pale with long black hair and an Asian cast. Ivy struggles with her vampiric nature on a personal level, and she also attempts to keep Rachel from other vampires and adversaries. She is bisexual and harbors a deep longing and affection for Rachel. She is deeply devoted to Rachel and Jenks, doing whatever it takes for them to be safe and happy, especially Rachel. Ivy is the last living vampire of the Tamwood family, and she is a sort of prodigy under her old master vampire Piscary.

Jenks
A pixy who joins Rachel and Ivy in their freelance business, Vampiric Charms. He often provides the comedy in the novels as well as working as a saboteur, electronics expert, and spy. He is always watching out for Rachel, worries about her and Ivy's interactions, as well as the men who come into her life as they usually turn out to be untrustworthy. When joining Rachel in her life post-I.S., he uses his wish to make himself sterile in order to prevent his wife from leaving him; they have 54 children, and she would not survive having more, the last birthing of pixy newlings did not survive the year the family moved into the church. Nearing the maximum life expectancy for pixies, he worries about what will happen to both his family and his partners after he is gone; Rachel unknowingly resets his life span with a transformation curse. His wife, Matalina, dies. Jenks is something of a pixy pioneer, going where no pixy has gone before. He also owns the church the partners all live in.

Secondary Characters

Algaliarept "Al"

A demon who trades in demonic familiars. Summoned to kill both Rachel and Trent in the first novel, he becomes more than just a staple character in the second after making deals with Rachel and Nick. Algaliarept is determined to replace Ceri with Rachel as his familiar, and most of his plots revolve around these efforts. Rachel derisively refers to him as "Big Al," which also helps her to avoid accidentally summoning the demon. When the demons accidentally discover that he concealed the fact that Rachel can spindle ley line energy, he falls into disgrace. After Rachel steals his summoning name from within the ever-after, he makes a deal with her, agreeing to take her on as a student and teach her demon magic to help regain his reputation and stay out of prison. He later finally agrees to switch summoning names back with Rachel in "Black Magic Sanction " after Rachel is summoned by the coven of moral and ethical standards on multiple occasions.  He is referred to as "Gally" by Newt. He was married to a demoness named Celfnnah.

Captain S. Edden
Initially appears in Dead Witch Walking. The captain of the local FIB office. Arranges for the FIB to pay off Rachel's death bounty in exchange for her becoming a freelance operative aiding the FIB in their attempt to keep up with the I.S. Rachel's pay from the FIB eventually becomes entangled in red tape, so Edden arranges for her to own Francis's car after he is murdered.

Ceridwen "Ceri" Merriam Dulciate
An elf of royal blood who spent a thousand years as Algaliarept's familiar. Ceri loved Al and chose to go with him into the ever-after rather than marry the elven prince she was betrothed to, grow old, and eventually die. She is rescued by Rachel from her servitude. She is adept in demon magic and lived with Keasley until she became pregnant and moved into the Kalamack compound (supposedly as an undercover spy for Rachel, who Ceri claims is her Sa'han). Ceri is skilled at both Ley Line and Demon magic, and has taught Rachel a great deal about both.  While she finds Trent Kalamack attractive, she falls in love with Quen, who fathers her child, Ray. Ray is a girl, named after Rachel (her godmother) and is the second born  of the new, cured elven generation. She and Trent act as a public couple, maintain a warm relationship, and co-parent Lucy and Ray, but neither has romantic feelings for the other.

David Hue
A were loner and insurance claims adjuster. Forms a pack with Rachel as his alpha bitch in an effort to evade the responsibility of a true pack while gaining the professional benefits of being a pack's alpha. Assists Rachel in a couple of her cases. Affected by the were focus he hides for Rachel, he unintentionally turns several human girlfriends into weres, leading to several of their deaths; two of these women survived, adding to David and Rachel's pack. Has the powerful curse of the were focus transferred into him to save Rachel's life. Uncomfortable around Ivy, who has a crush on him. Refuses to date species that didn't originate from humans (e.g., witches). Values loyalty and trust in interpersonal relationships.  Their pack is called the Black Dandelion Pack.

Detective Mathew Glenn 
Initially appears in The Good, The Bad, and The Undead. Detective Glenn is the adoptive son of Captain Edden, he works with Rachel on several cases. It is an open secret in the department that he is Edden's son, and keeping the secret silent is something of a running gag in the books.  After Piscary forces Glenn to eat some Pizza, and Rachel and Ivy continue to introduced him to foods containing tomatoes which he now craves, much to his own chagrin.  He dates Ivy starting in Black Magic Sanction.  He and Ivy date for a while, and later they add Daryl as a threesome (during A Perfect Blood). Daryl moves in with Glenn.  After the events in A Perfect Blood, he quits the FIB and moves to Flagstaff, AZ with the nymph, Daryl, partially because of the cleaner air for the nymph health.  Rachel also believes that the-men-who-don’t-belong asked him to come to work for them. Ivy stays on good terms with both, actually going to Flagstaff to help them move.  But they officially break-up after the move.

Kisten "Kist" Parker Felps
A vampire who has a long history with Ivy, both as a friend and a lover, and understands her past better than anyone. He runs Piscary's operation as his scion. Kisten and Rachel become involved after Nick's departure from Cincinnati.  Ostracized by Piscary for protecting Rachel and Ivy, he dies twice (as a living and dead vampire) on the same night. The second death is to protect Rachel. In White Witch, Black Curse, we find out the vampire he was given to was Ivy's ex-boss, Art, whom she and Kisten had framed for a murder.

Nicholas "Nick" Gregory Sparagmos 
Nick has a number of professions such as demonologist, wizard (human that practices magic), and librarian, but his vocation is as a professional thief. Early in the series, he is Rachel's boyfriend, but after Rachel accidentally makes him her familiar, they begin to drift apart and eventually he ends their romantic relationship. Nick betrays Rachel's trust multiple times throughout the series (e.g., by trading personal information about her to Algaliarept, attempting to steal the Focus from Rachel, ratting her out to the Witch Council, etc.). He works with Jenks' eldest son, Jax; Jenks believes Nick corrupted his son.
Newt claims him as her familiar as payment for the death of her familiar Pierce.

Trenton Aloysius Kalamack
An elf who is an extremely successful businessman with massive resources and wealth.  Served for years on the City Council. He operates in the Hollows underground and runs several illegal operations on the side. Considered a good and kind employer and city benefactor, he nonetheless murders people throughout the series and does several other morally questionable things, earning Rachel's derision. He serves as a major antagonist/foil for the series, as Rachel knows of his crimes and repeatedly attempts to bring him to justice. He and Rachel have some shared history through the friendship and collaborative work of their fathers, who died days apart. They also attended summer camp together as children, where each received illegal medical treatments. He knows of Rachel's abilities and often seeks to have her work for him, which she rarely does willingly. His title among fellow elves who work for him is "Sa'han". He officially becomes Rachel's familiar in The Outlaw Demon Wails when she sacrifices some of her freedom to save him; this bond is later severed by Rachel. In Pale Demon, Trent asks Rachel to help him on an "elf quest" that proves to be stealing his daughter Lucy (his and Ellasbeth's). In A Perfect Blood, Trent admits to himself that he may be falling in love with Rachel, whom he rescues from a number of dangerous situations throughout the same book. Rachel is the godmother to Trent's children, Lucy and Ray. Ray is not Trent's child by blood, she is Ceri and Quen's child which is stated in the book "Outlaw Demon Wails".

Quen Hanson 
Trent's security chief.  He has, on occasion, saved Rachel's life, such as when she confronted Piscary after the rape and subsequent scion-making of Ivy. Rachel saved his, when she talked him through the drastic cure that freed him from the influence of Piscary's bites. He is known to wield black ley line magic, tinged green, and he is the father of Ceri's baby. Quen is "familiar" in Vietnamese

Additional Characters

In alphabetical order:
Alice Morgan - The mother of Rachel and Robbie.  An exceptionally accomplished earth witch, hampered by mental illness since the death of her husband Monty and her ingestion of at least one memory potion (her reasons for taking the memory potion are unknown). Responsible for outing Trent as an elf when she believed he was betraying Rachel. She is very loyal to her daughter. 
Art - An undead vampire and Ivy Tamwood's former partner. Attempts to cover up a murder using banshee tears and subsequently is framed by Ivy for a murder committed by Piscary.  Prominent figure in Undead in the Garden of Good and Evil and figures in the storyline of White Witch, Black Curse. Also, he's later revealed as the murderer of Kisten Felps and Denon is his scion.
Aston - A vampire who runs a local roller rink.
Audric - Son of Chrissie and nephew of Kisten Felps.  Appears in "The Bridges of Eden Park".
Belle - A wingless fairy (due to an earlier attack on the church) who saves Jenks's children during an invasion in "Pale Demon". Jenks later gives her permission to stay in the garden. She and Jenks have a complicated relationship.
Betty Bansen -  Tom Bansen's wife, who attempts to cover up her husband's dealings with Algaliarept in "The Outlaw Demon Wails".
Bis - A young gargoyle who takes up residence at the church where Rachel, Ivy, and Jenks live. 
Brett - A were subordinate in Walter Vincent's pack.  After Rachel defeats Vincent and Brett, he goes to Cincinnati and seeks to join Rachel's "pack".  He is among the were casualties during Trent's search for the Focus.
Candice - A living vampire. Former lover of Kisten and a bodyguard for Saladan.
Celfnnah - A demoness that Al was once married to.  First mentioned in "Ever After".
Chad - A deejay and rental clerk at Aston's roller rink.
Chrissie - Sister of Kisten Felps.
Dallkarackint ("Dali") - A bureaucratic demon who presides over Algaliarept's case.  Owns the demon restaurant named "Dalliance".
Daryl - A dryad (which falls into the nymph family) that Ivy and Glenn had a threesome.  She is not overly healthy, and even mild excitement can set off her asthma.  Glenn had installed an ozonator to help purify the air in his apartment for her, and redid the new furnishings with eco oriented,with no petroleum or synthetic anything to make her condition worse.  Toward the end of "A Perfect Blood" Glenn quits the FIB and moves to Flagstaff with Daryl because the air is cleaner.  Rachel states that Daryl has a "sweet honeyed smell".
DeLavine - A master vampire in Chicago. A rival to Piscary.
Denon - A vampire lackey and Rachel Morgan's former supervisor at the I.S.  Also spies on Ivy for her supervisor. He is demoted following Rachel and Ivy Tamwood's successful departure from the I.S. He is Art's scion who accidentally kills him when he was dying from Kisten's bite. 
Devon Cross - A reporter/blogger in the Hollows and for the Hollows Gazette.  Rachel has a charm that misfired close to him and made him go bald.  Mentioned in "The Hollows Insider" collection of stories.
Dr. Anders - A ley line witch and professor who taught Rachel. In the novel The Good, the Bad, and the Undead, she is apparently killed by demon-killing ley line practitioners. However, in The Outlaw Demon Wails, it is discovered that she works for Trent Kalamack and he set up a fake death for her.
Ellasbeth Withon - A highly intelligent and beautiful, though ill-tempered, elf who is Kalamack's fiancée due to a business arrangement. Rachel disrupts their wedding by arresting Trent at the altar. Ellasbeth later calls off the wedding for good. Biological mother to Lucy. 
Erica Randal - Ivy Tamwood's younger sister. Even though she has a different surname as Ivy, she is not Ivy's half-sister. To continue each parent's line, Ivy was given their mother's surname and Erica was given their father's.
Etude - A gargoyle, Bis's father.
Dr Ford Miller  - A human with an unusual gift of being able to read the emotions of those around him. He is a psychiatrist for the FIB. He is introduced in A Few Demon More, when he tries to help Rachel with the death of Kisten.  It is later speculated that he might be a rare Inderlander. He is "immune" to the effects of the child banshee, Holly Harbor, and ends up taking care of her when her mother, Mia Harbor, goes to prison.
Francis Percy - A fellow runner at the I.S. during Rachel's tenure there.  He curries favor with his supervisors, often to Rachel's detriment.  Unknown to the IS, Francis is also on Trent Kalamack's payroll as a mole for him.  Rachel and the FIB arrest Francis at the end of Dead Witch Walking on Brimstone/biodrug charges at the bus station.  He tried to cut a deal with the FIB As a result of attempts to provide information on Kalamack.  The FIB van he was being transported in explodes, killing him along with several FIB officers before they leave the bus station.  The FIB gave Rachel his car.
Gerald - A security officer working for Trent Kalamack.
Glissando - A gargoyle, friend of Bis's.
Gordian Nathaniel Pierce "Pierce" - The ghost of a witch who was buried alive in the 1800s and was brought out of purgatory by Rachel when she was eighteen in the anthology, Two Ghosts for Sister Rachel. Has haunted her for a year trying to get her attention in the novels. He is responsible for the "glitches" and changed ringtones on Rachel's cell phone. Gains Tom Bansen's body in White Witch, Black Curse through a deal with Al, after Bansen is killed by the Banshee child, Holly. This resulted in a familiar bond with the demon. Later, he becomes the familiar of Newt.
Holly Harbor - The banshee child of Mia and Remus.  Ford has custody of her.
Jack - A pixy son of Jenks and Matalina. Glues Jerrimatt's wings together; his name and four of his brothers' names make up Rachel's summoning name in "For a Few Demons More".  
Jake - A pixy son of Jenks and Matalina, birth brother to Jack and Jaul.
Janice- A pixy daughter of Jenks and Matalina.  Braids Rachel's hair in "For a Few Demons More".
Jariath – A pixy son of Jenks and Matalina.  Glues Jerrimatt's wigs together; his name and four of his brothers' names make up Rachel's summoning name in "For a Few Demons More". 
Jaul - A pixy son of Jenks and Matalina, birth brother to Jack, Jake, Jhan, Jhem, and Jixy.
Jax - A pixy, eldest son of Jenks and Matalina. Partners with Nick in stealing a significant were artifact, then is rescued by Rachel and Jenks when the thief's plan goes awry. Later, sets out with Nick, against the wishes of his parents. In "Black Magic Sanction" he is reunited with his parents. 
Jeremy - A pixy son of Jenks and Matalina.  Braids Rachel's hair in "For a Few Demons More".
Jerrimatt - A pixy son of Jenks and Matalina.  Often gets his wings glued together by Jack. Has a birth brother and two birth sisters, the last four surviving pixies born to Matalina. (The last birthing of pixies didn't survive.)
Jhan - A pixy son of Jenks and Matalina.   Jhan is learning to read now and is left in charge in "Pale Demon."
Jhem - A pixy, one of Jenks and Matalina's sons, seen in 'Ley Line Drifter,' a short story found in "Into the Woods."
Jih - A pixy, eldest daughter of Jenks and Matalina. She takes care of Keasley's garden with a pixy buck.
Jixy - A pixy, daughter of Jenks and Matalina.
Jocelynn - A pixy daughter of Jenks and Matalina.  Braids Rachel's hair in "For a Few Demons More".
Jolivia - A pixy daughter of Jenks and Matalina.  Jenks smooths out a gouge she put in the store room of their home in the stump while chasing her brother in 'Ley Line Drifter,' a short story found in "Into the Woods."
Josephine - A pixy daughter of Jenks and Matalina.  One of the younger children.  Rachel gives her permission to pix a salesman in the future. 
Jrixibell – A pixy, youngest daughter of Jenks and Matalina. Tossed acorns at Trent in "Pale Demon".
Jumoke - A pixy son of Jenks and Matalina.  Glues Jerrimatt's wigs together; his name and four of his brothers' names make up Rachel's summoning name in "For a Few Demons More".  He has brown hair and hazel eyes which make him unusual among pixies.
Junis -  A pixy son of Jenks and Matalina. Glues Jerrimatt's wigs together; his name and four of his brothers' names make up Rachel's summoning name in "For a Few Demons More".  
Jonathan Davaros - Trenton Kalamack's chief subordinate, also an elf, he despises Rachel Morgan and works against her in the series. When Rachel shifts into a mink to raid Trenton's offices and is caught, it is Jonathan who tortures her the most, poking and prodding her with pencils while she is caged. Reluctantly gives her respect after she saves Trenton.
Karen - A were female that challenges Rachel for the right to be David Hue's alpha.
Leon Bairnes "Keasley" - Goes by Keasley to avoid an I.S. death threat. A witch neighbor of the Vampiric Charms agency. He acts to save Rachel's life or to provide medical assistance on several occasions. Ceri resides with him.
Ku'Sox Sha-Ku'ru - Psychotic, sociopathic, genetically-engineered super-soldier demon created by the demon collective near the end of the Elf-Demon War. To give him the ability to face an elf in single combat, they gave him the female ability to hold two souls simultaneously within his aura. When he proved impossible to control it took five demons (only one of which survived) to subdue and imprison him underground where the Gateway Arch in St. Louis is later built. Trent Kalamack released him from his prison (Pale Demon).  Ku'Sox takes Jinx and Ivy captive, and attacks the city of San Francisco to try to lure Rachel out.  At the end of Pale Demon, Rachel is able to transfer the curse that Trent had given her, back to Ku'Sox and trap him in the Ever After.  They both almost die when Ku'Sox drags them both into a ley line. Later, in Ever After, he attempts to murder his parents (the entire demon collective), like a good little psycho, by destroying the Ever After, Rachel uses Elven Demon-Slaver Rings and Al's Demon Wedding Rings to bond with Al and Trent to destroy him.
Marshal - A witch who lent Rachel diving gear during her rescue of Nick. Eventually comes to Cincinnati and become the swim coach and a teacher at the University.  He and Rachel agree not to attempt to date, but to go out as friends. They eventually become intimate (by witches standards, using a Power Push/Pull), but their relationship ends when Rachel is shunned by the witch community.
Matalina - Jenks's wife and mother of his many children.  Serves as a nurse for the Vampiric Charms agency.  Over the course of the novels, she falls into ill health as she reaches the end of her life span. Sadly, she passed in "Black Magic Sanction".
Mia Harbor - A banshee who attempts to seduce Ivy Tamwood. She received Ivy's wish as a payment for helping the living vampire. She uses the wish to find someone to love and who could produce a child with her that wouldn't kill the father. She is an antagonist in White Witch, Black Curse.
Minias - A demon who serves as Newt's keeper/familiar until relieved of those duties. As Newt is the last female demon, Minias is additionally tasked to seduce her as there have been no demon births in five thousand years, but this is a dangerous task because she has killed all her previous lovers. Owes Rachel a favor, and he consequently wears her mark (similar to a demon mark) until it is repaid.
Montgomery Morgan - Rachel's deceased father. Although he was human, his skill in ley line magic enabled him to keep this fact hidden from the authorities and the general populace. He raised Rachel and Robbie as his own children until his death in an attempt to rid his body of a vampire's claim.
Mr. Randal - Ivy's father.  A living vampire, he provides the blood needed to keep Ivy's mother sane.
Mrs. Ellen Sarong - One of the prominent weres in Cincinnati and the owner of the Howlers, a local baseball team made up of weres. She hires Rachel Morgan to retrieve the team mascot. Has an intense rivalry with Mr. Ray.  Her pack is called the Broken Fence Pack.
Newt - The most powerful demon in existence, with the possible exceptions of Rachel and Ku'Sox. In the distant past, she killed every other female demon, which caused her insanity and resulted in her being the only female demon (until Rachel). Demon laws don't apply to her because it is said that "she makes the laws." Rachel gains a mark from Newt in payment for moving her between the ley lines in "Every Which Way But Dead".
Pam Vincent  - The were alpha female in Walter Vincent's pack. Rachel challenges her to a duel, but Pam is defeated when pure wolves attack her.
Peter - A living vampire from Chicago. Assists Rachel in helping Nick escape from packs of weres.
Piscary - An Egyptian undead vampire. He runs most of the Hollows' illegal and underground activities. Sadistic and cruel, he torments and rapes Ivy, whom he believes to be his soulmate. Attempts to remove both Rachel and Trent from the picture by many means. Organizes the death of several ley line witches to prevent Kalamack from gaining more power; this series of crimes leads to his imprisonment for five centuries.  Still tries to exert control of his domain through Ivy, who has become his scion in order to protect Rachel and her own sister Erica. Piscary is killed by Skimmer when he attempts to turn Ivy undead at a meeting held to sort out custodianship of the were Focus. 
Remus - The psychopathic, human husband of Mia Harbor and biological father of her child, Holly. Met Mia when he tried to rape her. 
Robbie Morgan - Rachel's older brother.  Tries to dissuade her from joining the I.S.  Has been on uneasy terms with his family since finding out his true paternity.  Although mentioned throughout the series, he makes his first appearance in the short story "Two Ghosts for Sister Rachel" in the Holidays Are Hell anthology.  Appears in the book White Witch, Black Curse.
Rynn Cormel - The new master vampire in Cincinnati. In addition to writing a best-selling guide to dating and having safe sex with vampires, he served as the leader of the United States during the Turn. He took over Piscary's vampire duties after Piscary was killed the second time. 
Sara Jane Gradenko - A personal secretary working for Trent Kalamack, who trusts her. She is smart and hails from a farm. Treated Rachel well when she was a mink trapped in a cage in Trent's office. Doesn't like Jonathan. Part of a plot to trick Rachel into investigating the ley line witch murders. Sister to Winnie Gradenko; together the sisters murdered a journalist making trouble for Trent and Rachel.
Sidereal - The leader of the fairy clan that attacks the church in Black Magic Sanction.  Rachel negotiates with him to accompany Ceri to Trent's estate to be her eyes and ears, "You could live there unnoticed, spying for her. For my benefit.".  But Sidereal demands that one of his fairies, Belle, stay behind at the church "To better kill you if you plan treachery."
Simon Ray - The owner of the were baseball team, The Rays, and a prominent were in Cincinnati. He has an intense rivalry with Mrs. Sarong.  His pack is called the Silver Koi Pack.
Skimmer - Real name, Dorothy Claymor. A female living vampire from California and Ivy's lover from back in high school. She is a lawyer that was working to free Piscary from prison so she could have gained permission to stay in Cincinnati. She is imprisoned for wrongful death after she kills (beheads) Piscary when he attempts to turn Ivy into an undead vampire against Ivy's will. Hates Rachel and emotionally manipulates Ivy.
Stanley "Lee" Saladan - The only other witch cured by Trent's father of Rosewood Syndrome, making him the only male demon on this side of the lines. A practitioner of ley line and demon magic. One of many individuals trying to move in on Piscary's territory while the vampire is in prison. He also harbors a deep rivalry with Trenton Kalamack going back to their childhood; they are, strangely, friends of a sort. Temporarily trapped in the ever-after as Al's familiar, he makes a deal with Al that allows the demon to possess him in order to get out of the ever-after.
Takata - A witch and a musician, he is the most popular musician described in the series.  Rachel knows him personally, having helped him in the past. Rachel later discovers that he is her biological father. Takata records music that includes subliminal lyrics intended for vampires. His real name is Donald. Gets back together with Rachel's mother Alice later in the series.
Tom Bansen  - Tom is an investigator in the I.S. Arcane division and leader of a black magic coven. He had a grudge against Rachel when she refused his offer to join him and his conspirators. In The Outlaw Demon Wails, Tom was the one summoning and then releasing Algaliarept so he would go after Rachel. In White Witch, Black Curse, Tom is killed by the banshee, Mia Harbor. His body is then taken by Algaliarept and used as a vessel for Gordian Pierce.
Treble - Al's gargoyle, a female.
Walter Vincent - A megalomaniacal were alpha who figures prominently in A Fistful of Charms.  His pack was the Celtic Knot Pack.

Organizations 

 Inderland Security (IS) - 
 Federal Inderland Bureau (FIB) - 
 Humans Against Paranormals Association (HAPA) - an extremist hate group that had gained a brief foothold during the Turn and advocated genocide for the very same people they’d lived next to and who’d taken great personal risks to keep them alive.  It was believed HAPA had vanished years ago, but perhaps that’s only what the I.S. had wanted everyone to think.  They first mentioned in A Perfect Blood, where they seek to develop demon blood to create to kill off all the Inderland species.  We also find out that HAPA had  infiltrated the FIB.
 The Order aka. men-who-don’t-belong - they’re human, and they’re targeting HAPA,

References

Hollows